Razullo is a zanni figure in commedia dell'arte theatre. A sketch by Jacques Callot shows him with Cucurucu.

References

Stupid Zanni class characters